Rezaul Haque Sarkar is a Bangladesh Nationalist Party politician and the former Member of Parliament of Rangpur-9.

Career
Sarkar was elected to parliament from Rangpur-9 as a Bangladesh Nationalist Party candidate in 1979.

References

Bangladesh Nationalist Party politicians
2nd Jatiya Sangsad members